Leucodecton fuscomarginatum is a species of lichen in the family Graphidaceae. Found in Sri Lanka, it was formally described as a new species in 2014 by lichenologists Gothamie Weerakoon, Robert Lücking  and Helge Thorsten Lumbsch. The lichen, which is known to occur only at the type locality, grows in disturbed vegetation. The specific epithet fuscomarginatum refers to the rims of the ascomata pores, which are typically brown in colour. Leucodecton fuscomarginatum has a shiny, smooth, light greenish to yellowish brown thallus measuring 50–100 μm thick with a thin cortex. The ascospores are muriform, ellipsoid in shape, and measure 30–40 by 10–12 μm. Secondary chemicals present in the lichen include stictic acid, constictic acid, acetylconstictic acid, and hypostictic acid.

References

Graphidaceae
Lichen species
Lichens of Sri Lanka
Lichens described in 2014
Taxa named by Helge Thorsten Lumbsch
Taxa named by Robert Lücking
Taxa named by Gothamie Weerakoon